The 2001 Victorian Football League season was the 120th season of the Australian rules football competition.

The premiership was won by the Box Hill Football Club, after defeating Werribee by 37 points in the Grand Final on 23 September. It was the first top division premiership won by Box Hill in its 51 seasons in the VFA/VFL.

League membership and affiliations
In a continuation of the VFL's amalgamation with the AFL reserves, which had begun in 2000, there were several changes to the VFL-AFL reserves affiliations in 2001.
 affiliated with Coburg-Fitzroy. Under the affiliation, the team's nickname was changed from Lions to Tigers to match Richmond's nickname, and the partnership with Fitzroy came to an end, resulting in the team becoming known as the Coburg Tigers. The financial stability brought by the affiliation saved Coburg from extinction, as the club had been in administration since July 2000 and would have been wound up if it had not entered an AFL affiliation.
, which had been jointly affiliated with Williamstown and Werribee, became fully affiliated with Werribee.
 affiliated with Williamstown
 affiliated with Springvale

In addition to these changes, a new team from Tasmania was admitted to the VFL; the admission was initially on a one-year trial basis, and a permanent licence was ultimately granted. Created and administered by Football Tasmania (later AFL Tasmania), the Tasmanian VFL club was designed to provide an opportunity for state level football in Tasmania to fill the void left by the collapse of the Tasmanian Statewide Football League at the end of the 2000 season. The club came to be known as the Tasmanian Devils, and played its home games throughout Tasmania, with five games at York Park in Launceston, four games at North Hobart Oval in Hobart, and one game at Devonport Oval in Devonport in its first season.

Consequently, there were sixteen teams in the VFL in 2001: eight clubs with VFL-AFL affiliations, three AFL reserves teams, and five stand-alone VFL clubs.

Premiership season

Ladder

Finals Series

Grand Final

Awards
The Jim 'Frosty' Miller Medal was won for the third consecutive year by Nick Sautner (Frankston), who kicked 73 goals.
The J. J. Liston Trophy was jointly won by Brett Backwell (Carlton reserves) and Ezra Poyas (Coburg), who each polled 19 votes. Backwell and Poyas finished ahead of Simon Feast (Port Melbourne), who was third with 15 votes.
The Fothergill-Round Medal was won by Kristian DePasquale (Coburg).
Werribee won the reserves premiership. Werribee 17.12 (114) defeated Williamstown 12.15 (87) in the Grand Final, held as a curtain-raiser to the Seniors Grand Final on 23 September.

Notable events
In Round 12,  5.11 (41) trailed  13.14 (92) by 51 points at three-quarter time, before kicking ten goals to one to win the game by five points, 15.13 (103) d. 14.14 (98). It was the largest three-quarter time deficit overcome in a VFA/VFL game since 1949.

See also 
 List of VFA/VFL premiers
 Australian rules football
 Victorian Football League
 Australian Football League
 2001 AFL season

References

Victorian Football League seasons
VFL